Domingos Puglisi (born 4 November 1911, date of death unknown) was a Brazilian sprinter. He competed in the men's 400 metres at the 1932 Summer Olympics.

References

External links
 

1911 births
Year of death missing
Athletes (track and field) at the 1932 Summer Olympics
Brazilian male sprinters
Brazilian male middle-distance runners
Olympic athletes of Brazil
Place of birth missing
20th-century Brazilian people